Isaac Stearns Jr. (June 13, 1750 – April 29, 1807), of Billerica, Massachusetts, was a sergeant in the American Revolutionary Army. On April 19, 1775, he was among the minutemen who rallied at the first alarm at the onset of the Battles of Lexington and Concord. He was also a member of a group of forty men, led by Ethan Allen, that captured Fort Ticonderoga. Stearns contributed £10 to a fund established to hire men to serve in the Revolutionary Army.

Stearns was a soldier in the Siege of Boston for eight months and participated in the Battle of Bunker Hill, where he stood alongside Colonel William Prescott and advised him as to when the British were near enough to fire upon, stating: "there, that will do." On December 18, 1777, Stearns married Mary Crosby. The couple relocated to Ashburnham the following year. Stearns died on April 29, 1807.

References

Bibliography 

1750 births
1807 deaths
People from Billerica, Massachusetts
People of colonial Massachusetts
Continental Army soldiers